The Nuestra Belleza El Salvador Universo 2008 was held on May 3, 2008, in the Auditorio ILC Fepade, San Salvador, El Salvador. There were 15 contestant representing departments and the Salvadoran community. The winner will enter Miss Universe 2008 and Miss Continente Americano 2008.

Results

Special awards

Miss Photogenic - Rebeca Moreno (San Salvador)
Best National Costume - Larissa Aguirre (Cabañas)
Miss Congeniality (voted by contestants) - Maryethe Martínez (La Unión)
Best Hair - Carmen Salazar (Santa Ana)
Best Legs - Rebeca Moreno (San Salvador)
Best Face - Rebeca Moreno (San Salvador)
Miss Fashion - Cecilia Silva (San Vicente)

Candidates

References

External links
Official Website

2008
2008 beauty pageants
2008 in El Salvador